My Mother Is a Daughter-in-law is a 2015 South Korean morning comedy-drama series broadcast by SBS starring Kim Hye-ri, Shim Yi-young and Kim Jeong-hyeon. The program premiered on June 22, 2015, and ended on December 31, 2015, airing every Monday to Friday at 8:30am for 136 episodes.

Synopsis
Gyeong-sook (Kim Hye-ri) married a wealthy older man when she was 19 years old. After the passing of her antagonistic mother-in-law and the recent death of her husband, she depends on her son Jung-soo (Lee Yong-joon), who is a doctor.

Gyeong-sook disapproves of his girlfriend Hyun-joo because of her poor family background. Nevertheless, Jung-soo and Hyun-joo marry. Gyeong-sook antagonizes her new daughter-in-law. After Jung-soo dies in a car accident, Gyeong-sook and Hyun-joo are no longer family.

Both Gyeong-sook and Hyun-joo eventually remarry. Through a twist of fate, Gyeong-sook becomes Hyun-joo's daughter-in-law.

Cast and characters

Main cast
Kim Hye-ri as Chu Gyeong-sook
Shim Yi-young as Yoo Hyun-joo
Kim Jeong-hyeon as Jang Seong-tae

Supporting cast
Lee Yong-joon as Kim Jeong-soo
Moon Bo-ryung as Kim Soo-kyung
Oh Young-sil as Kim Yeom-soon
Kwon Jae-hee as Seo Mi-ja
Choi Sung-ho as Yoo Jae-yong
Lee Jin-ah as Kang Eun-hye
Go Na-hee as Candy Yoo
Son Jang-woo as Kim Dong-woo
Han Mi-sook as Go Young-seon
Kim Na-mi as Mi Yeon
Kwon Seong-deok as Yang Moon-tak
Lee Han-wi as Park Bong-joo
Kim Tae-young as Im Jeong-bae
Lee Seon-ho as Joo Kyeong-min
Kim Dong-gyun as Gap Boo-jang
Seong Chang-hoon as Song Yoo-sik
Han Ji-an as Jeon Eul-hee
Jo Eun-bit as Jo Kyung

Extended cast
Kim Na-young  as Im Jeong-ok
Kang Seo-joon as Baek Chang-seok
Jung Geun as Nam Young-gook
Won Geun-hee 
Won Jong-rye as Joo Kyung-min's mother
Yoo Joo-won

Cameo appearance
Lee Yong-joon as psychic medium
Yoon Hyun-jin as new anchor

Awards and nominations
2015 SBS Drama Awards Special actor (weekend/daily series): Lee Han-wi

References

External links
  
 

Seoul Broadcasting System television dramas
2015 South Korean television series debuts
2015 South Korean television series endings
Korean-language television shows
South Korean romantic comedy television series
Television series by IWill Media